Indonesia competed at the 2019 World Athletics Championships in Doha, Qatar, from 27 September–6 October 2019.

Result 

 Key

 Note–Ranks given for track events are for the entire round
 Q = Qualified for the next round
 q = Qualified for the next round as a fastest loser or, in field events, by position without achieving the qualifying target
 NR = National record
 GR = Games record
 PB = Personal best
 SB = Season best
 DNF = Did not finish
 DNS = Did not start
 NM = No mark
 N/A = Round not applicable for the event
 Bye = Athlete not required to compete in round

References

External links

PASI Kirim Zohri dan Maria Londa ke Kejuaraan Dunia Atletik
Pasi tidak pasang target tinggi di kejuaraan dunia atletik 2019

Nations at the 2019 World Athletics Championships
World Championships in Athletics
Indonesia at the World Championships in Athletics